Sikar is a city and municipal council in the Sikar district of the state of Rajasthan in India. It is the administrative headquarters of the Sikar district. It is part of the Shekhawati region, which consists of Sikar, Churu and Jhunjhunu. Sikar is a major coaching hub of the country post Kota for competitive examination preparations and has a number of engineering and medical coaching institutes.

Sikar is a historical city and contains many old havelis.

Sikar is also popular for The Khatu Shyam Temple Situated in the Khatoo Village, 16 km from Reengus.

History

History 
Sikar had been the biggest Thikana (Estate) of the Jaipur state. Previously Sikar was known as Shekhawati Pradesh. It was the capital of Thikana Sikar. Sikar is surrounded by fortified walls consisting of seven "Pols" (gates). These historic gates are named: Bawari Gate, Fatehpuri Gate, Nani Gate, Surajpole Gate, Dujod Gate Old, Dujod Gate New, and Chandpole Gate. Shekhawat Rajputs were rulers of this region.

kar had been the biggest Thikana (Estate) of the Jaipur state. Previously Sikar was known as Shekhawati Pradesh. It was the capital of Thikana Sikar. Sikar is surrounded by fortified walls consisting of seven "Pols" (gates). These historic gates are named: Bawari Gate, Fatehpuri Gate, Nani Gate, Surajpole Gate, Dujod Gate Old, Dujod Gate New, and Chandpole Gate. Shekhawat Rajputs were rulers of this region.
Nearb nd manish ji

Geography and climate

Geography
Sikar city is the district headquarters of Rajasthan's Sikar district, which is situated in the eastern part of Rajasthan. It is the sixth most populous city of Rajasthan. It is located a t.

Climate

Demographics

Sikar City had a population of about 237,579 people according to the census of 2011. As per provisional reports of Census India, the population of Sikar in 2011 is 237,579; of which there are approximately 123,156 males and 114,423 females. The sex ratio of Sikar City is 929 females per 1000 males. Regarding education, total literates in Sikar city are 158,413 of which 91,403 are males while 67,010 are females. The average literacy rate of Sikar City is 77.13, male and female literacy status is 86.29 and 67.37, respectively. The total population of children (0-6) in Sikar City is about 32,189, consisting of 17,236 boys and 14,953 girls. The child sex ratio of girls is 868 per 1000 boys.

Places of interest
Being a City in Rajasthan with rich cultural backdrop, Sikar has many havelis, some of which are centuries old. Other than its havelis, Sikar is also famous for its ancient forts made before and during the British rule in India.

.

0.

Administration
The Collector and District Magistrate (DM) of Sikar is Dr. Amit Yadav (2016) and Superintendent of Police is Shri Kuwar Rastradeep (2009). 

Sikar city is governed by a Municipal Council, which comes under the Sikar Urban Agglomeration. The new municipal council building is built in Shekhawati style like a mahal or haveli. Sikar city is divided into 60 wards. Although Sikar city has a population of 237,579 (in 2011), its urban/metropolitan population is 244,563 (in 2011). The Sikar metropolitan area includes Chandrapura (Rural), Radhakrishnpura, Samarthpura, Shivsinghpura and Sikar city. The current Member of Parliament from Sikar is Swami Sumedhanand Saraswati elected in May 2014 and continue in May 2019

Modes of transportation

Rail

Sikar Junction railway station comes within the territory of the North Western Railway. Sikar City is connected to Jhunjhunu, Rewari, Delhi, Churu, Bikaner, Sri Ganganagar, Hisar, Jaipur, Kota, Ajmer, Udaipur, Abu Road, Indore, Ahmedabad and Mumbai, Mathura,PrayagrajAlwar. New lines proposed since 2010 are Sikar to Nokha via Sujangarh and Sikar to Neem-Ka-Thana via Udaipurwati.

Road
Sikar is well connected by roads from all the major cities of Rajasthan and nearby states. A four-lane national highway NH-52 passes through the city. NH-52 connects Sikar with Jaipur and Bikaner. The western freight corridor also pass through Ringas of Sikar, as a main project of the central government. Kotputali Kuchaman Mega Highway also passes through Sikar. Jhunjhunu-Jaipur state highway is also passes through Sikar.

Airport
The nearest airport to Sikar City is Jaipur International Airport, which operates daily flights to Delhi, Mumbai, Hyderabad, Bangalore, Pune, Indore, Ahmedabad, Chennai, Guwahati, Kolkata, Udaipur, Dubai, Sharjah, and Muscat. A new airport is proposed at Shahpura (a town in Jaipur district) that is very close to Sikar. A small air strip at Tarpura village is also available for the landing of small private planes against payment.

Education

Over the past decade, a burgeoning coaching industry has catapulted Sikar into a popular education hub, concurrently stimulating the local economy and augmenting the prominence of this previously obscure town. Thousands of high school students from neighboring areas, and increasingly from far-flung corners, flock every year to enroll in one of the wide array of Sikar's premier coaching institutes, which prepare them for the notoriously competitive engineering and medical entrance examinations that preface the greatly coveted IITs and Medical Colleges.

The city also attracts a substantial number of college undergraduates and post-graduates seeking coaching for the Competitive exams that determine their government job prospects. With regards to higher education institutes, Sikar boasts several leading public and private universities offering sciences, arts, and engineering degrees. Most notably, the government recently established the Sikar Medical College, a varsity part of the distinguished, nationwide public medical college network.

This newfound stature and renown has led the media to dub Sikar as the "Education City of Rajasthan", and colloquially, as the 'Kota of Northern Rajasthan,' owing to Kota's status as the coaching capital of India.

See also
 Sikar district
 Sikar (Lok Sabha constituency)
 Sikar (Rajasthan Assembly constituency)

References

External links
Official page:Sikar

 
Cities and towns in Sikar district
Shekhawati
Thar Desert